Aphrosylus ferox is a species of fly in the family Dolichopodidae.

References

Hydrophorinae
Insects described in 1851
Diptera of Europe
Taxa named by Alexander Henry Haliday